Oleksandr Oleksandrovych Aksyonov (born 7 January 1994) is a Ukrainian professional footballer who plays as a centre-back for Ukrainian club Mynai.

Career
Aksyonov is a product of the FC Metalurh Donetsk Youth school system. He made his debut for SC Tavriya Simferopol playing as the substituted player in the game against FC Dnipro Dnipropetrovsk on 15 September 2013 in the Ukrainian Premier League.

References

External links
 
 
 

1994 births
Living people
Footballers from Kramatorsk
Ukrainian footballers
Association football defenders
FC Kramatorsk players
FC Retro Vatutine players
SC Tavriya Simferopol players
FC Mariupol players
FC Shakhtar-3 Donetsk players
FC Arsenal Kyiv players
MFC Mykolaiv players
MFC Mykolaiv-2 players
FC Hirnyk-Sport Horishni Plavni players
FK Banga Gargždai players
FC Uzhhorod players
FC Mynai players
Ukrainian Premier League players
Ukrainian First League players
Ukrainian Second League players
Ukrainian Amateur Football Championship players
A Lyga players
Ukrainian expatriate footballers
Expatriate footballers in Lithuania
Ukrainian expatriate sportspeople in Lithuania